Oko (Old ) is a Russian (previously Soviet) missile defence early warning programme consisting of satellites in Molniya and geosynchronous orbits. Oko satellites are used to identify launches of ballistic missiles by detection of their engines' exhaust plume in infrared light, and complement other early warning facilities such as Voronezh, Daryal and Dnepr radars. The information provided by these sensors can be used for the A-135 anti-ballistic missile system which defends Moscow. The satellites are run by the Russian Aerospace Forces, and previously the Russian Aerospace Defence Forces and Russian Space Forces. Since November 2015, it is being replaced by the new EKS system.

History 
Development of the Oko system began in the early 1970s under the design bureau headed by AI Savin, which became TsNII Kometa. The spacecraft element was designed by NPO Lavochkin. The first satellite was launched in 1972  but it was not until 1978 that the overall system became operational and 1982 before it was placed on combat duty. The system had a major malfunction in 1983 when it mistakenly identified sunlight on high altitude clouds as a missile attack. Stanislav Petrov, on duty at the new control centre in Serpukhov-15, Moscow Oblast, discounted the warning due to the newness of the system and the lack of corroboration from ground-based radar.

The vast majority of the satellites launched (86 out of 100 as of March 2012 ) have been the first generation US-K satellites which operate in molniya orbits. Seven first generation satellites were launched into geosynchronous orbits, called US-KS, starting in 1975. A decree of 3 September 1979 led to the creation of the second generation satellites US-KMO which had their first launch in 1991. In total, 101 satellites have been launched.

The US-K satellites, were launched by Molniya-M launch vehicles with Blok 2BL upper stages from Plesetsk Cosmodrome. The US-KS and US-KMO operate in geosynchronous orbits and were launched by Proton with DM-2 upper stages from Baikonur.

The last US-KMO satellite (Kosmos 2479) was launched on 30 March 2012  and the last US-K satellite (Kosmos 2469) on 30 September 2010. They are due to be replaced by a new system called EKS.

Facilities 
The system has two dedicated control centres. The western centre is at Serpukhov-15 near Kurilovo outside Moscow  and the eastern centre is at Pivan-1  in the Russian Far East. The centre at Serpukhov-15 burned down in 2001  which caused the loss of contact with currently orbiting satellites.

See also 

 Defense Support Program
 Space-Based Infrared System
 EKS, the new system replacing the entire Oko program.

Notes

References

External links 
 Novosti Kosmonavtiki.ru: Kosmos 520 in the Lavochkin Museum 
 Novosti Kosmonavtiki.ru: telescopes
 Novosti Kosmonavtiki.ru: infrared telescope
 Novosti Kosmonavtiki.ru: antenna

 
Early warning systems
Missile defense
Reconnaissance satellites of Russia
Reconnaissance satellites of the Soviet Union
Early warning satellites
Military equipment introduced in the 1970s